"You're in the Army Now" is a song by the South African-born Dutch duo Bolland & Bolland, released in 1982. The song spent six consecutive weeks on the top of the Norwegian singles chart. A cover by British rock band Status Quo, simplified as "In the Army Now", was internationally successful in 1986.

Charts

Status Quo version

In 1986, British rock band Status Quo covered "In the Army Now" on their 1986 album of the same name. Their version peaked at number 2 in the UK Singles Chart. It hit the top of the charts in German-speaking Europe as well as Ireland, whilst peaking highly in Norway, Spain and Sweden.

In September 2010, Status Quo released a new version of the song with the Corps of Army Choir through their label Universal/UMC as a special release. The lyrics were changed to a pro-soldier version. All profits from this updated version are donated equally to the British Forces Foundation and Help for Heroes charities. This charted at no. 31 in the UK Singles charts upon its release.

Track listings
7" single
"In the Army Now" (Bolland/Bolland) – 3:52
"Heartburn" (Patrick/Parfitt/Rossi) – 4:44

12" maxi
A-Side
"In the Army Now" (military mix) – 5:55
B-Side
"Heartburn" (Patrick/Parfitt/Rossi) – 4:44
"Late Last Night" (Young/Parfitt/Rossi) – 2:58

Charts

Weekly charts

Year-end charts

Certifications and sales

Other cover versions
The song has also been adapted for a musical based on the film An Officer and a Gentleman, which has changed the title and chorus to "In the Navy Now" to fit in with the plot.

See also
Lists of number-one singles (Austria)
List of number-one hits of 1986 (Germany)
List of number-one singles of 1986 (Ireland)
List of number-one songs in Norway
List of number-one singles of the 1980s (Switzerland)

References

1982 songs
1982 singles
1986 singles
Anti-war songs
Irish Singles Chart number-one singles
Number-one singles in Austria
Number-one singles in Finland
Number-one singles in Germany
Number-one singles in Iceland
Number-one singles in Norway
Number-one singles in Switzerland
Song recordings produced by Pip Williams
Songs about the military
Songs written by Ferdi Bolland
Songs written by Rob Bolland
Status Quo (band) songs
Teldec singles
Vertigo Records singles